The cottonwood borer (Plectrodera scalator) is a species of longhorn beetle found in the United States east of the Rocky Mountains that feeds on cottonwood trees. It is one of the largest insects in North America, with lengths reaching  and widths, . It is the only species in the genus Plectrodera.

Description
The adult cottonwood borer is a large longhorn beetle with a black-and-white coloration and black antennae as long or longer than the body. The white portions are due to microscopic masses of hair.

Life cycle
The female cottonwood borer will chew small pits in the base of the tree in which to lay her eggs.  The larvae can take up to two years to mature, after which they pupate in a root below ground level for approximately three weeks.  Once metamorphosis has completed, the now-adult chews its way out of the root and digs up to the surface.

Environmental impact
Although larvae can kill young trees by girdling them, infested mature trees are usually not seriously injured.  The larvae can also structurally weaken a young tree, which is then more susceptible to falling over in high winds.  Adults feed on leaf stems and the bark of tender shoots, occasionally causing flagging.

References

Lamiini
Beetles of North America
Beetles described in 1792